Bill G. Porter (born September 18, 1959) is an American professional golfer.

Porter was born in Moses Lake, Washington. He played one year of college golf at the University of Oregon before turning professional in 1980.

Porter worked as a club pro and played on mini-tours until earning his Ben Hogan Tour card (now Nationwide Tour) in the 1991 Q School. He played on the Nationwide Tour and PGA Tour from 1992 to 1996. On the Nationwide Tour (1992–94, 1996), he won once at the 1994 Nike Louisiana Open. On the PGA Tour (1995), his best finish was T-11 at the Deposit Guaranty Golf Classic. He also won several events in the Pacific Northwest.

Porter has been the head golf professional at The Links at Moses Pointe in Moses Lake since 2003.

Professional wins (9)

Nike Tour wins (1)

Other wins (8)
1997 Oregon Open, Northwest Open
1998 Oregon Open, Northwest Open
2000 Oregon Open, Northwest Open
2001 Pacific Northwest PGA Championship
2002 Washington Open

Results in major championships

CUT = missed the half-way cut
WD = withdrew
"T" = tied
Note: Porter never played in the Masters Tournament or The Open Championship.

See also
1994 PGA Tour Qualifying School graduates

References

External links

American male golfers
Oregon Ducks men's golfers
PGA Tour golfers
Golfers from Washington (state)
People from Moses Lake, Washington
1959 births
Living people